Susan Frances Maria Williams, Baroness Williams of Trafford  (née McElroy; born 16 May 1967) is a Conservative life peer serving as the Chief Whip of the House of Lords and Captain of the Honourable Corps of Gentlemen-at-Arms. In March 2022 she was made a member of the Privy Council. She held the position of Minister of State for six years, thus she holds the record of being a mid-level minister for the longest time.

Education 
Williams was educated at La Sagesse School, a Roman Catholic private school in Newcastle upon Tyne, and  Huddersfield Polytechnic, where she gained a BSc Hons in Applied Nutrition.

Career

Early political career
She was a member of Trafford Metropolitan Borough Council from 1998 to 2011, representing Altrincham, and the council's leader from 2004 to 2009, leading a Conservative majority until she stepped down.

She has also been a member of various public bodies in the North West region. As a parliamentary candidate, she first stood unsuccessfully for the safe Labour Wythenshawe and Sale East constituency in 2001, and for the  Bolton West constituency in the 2010 general election, losing by 92 votes.

House of Lords and ministerial career

On 20 September 2013 she was created a life peer as Baroness Williams of Trafford, of Hale in the county of Greater Manchester.

In April 2014, Williams succeeded Earl Attlee as baroness-in-waiting (government whip).

In 2015, David Cameron appointed Williams to his second government as a Parliamentary Under Secretary of State for Communities and Local Government. On 28 May 2015 she introduced the Cities and Local Government Devolution Bill 2015–16 to the House of Lords.

Williams was appointed Minister for Countering Extremism, the Home Office representative in the House of Lords in the First May ministry.

She was appointed Minister of State for Equalities in January 2018 by Theresa May.

In the 2020 British cabinet reshuffle, Williams was made Minister of State at the Home Office, and in March 2022 was made a member of the Privy Council, entitling her to the post-nominals PC for life.

Following the resignation of Boris Johnson, and the appointment of Liz Truss as Prime Minister of the United Kingdom, Williams was appointed as Chief Whip of the Conservative Party in the House of Lords and Captain of the Honourable Corps of Gentlemen-at-Arms.

References

External links 
 Baroness Williams of Trafford – www.parliament.uk

1967 births
Living people
Williams of Trafford
Life peeresses created by Elizabeth II
Williams of Trafford
Alumni of the University of Huddersfield
People from Altrincham
People from Cork (city)
Female interior ministers
Irish emigrants to the United Kingdom
British people of Irish descent
Honourable Corps of Gentlemen at Arms
Members of the Privy Council of the United Kingdom